is a Japanese manga artist.
In 1995, Half Court was serialized in Magazine Special from No. 1 to No. 11. After the serial publication of Parallel in Magazine Special from No. 8 in 2000 to No. 1 in 2002, Pastel was serialized in Weekly Shonen Magazine from the 32nd issue in 2002 to the 33rd issue in 2003. And now Pastel has been running as a serial ever since Magazine Special No. 10 in 2003.

Works
Half Court
Parallel (2000–02)
Pastel (2002–2017)
Sailor Fuku, Tokidoki Apron [Schoolgirl Landlord Honoka](2013-2015, 4 volumes)

External links

People from Hiroshima Prefecture
Living people
Manga artists
Year of birth missing (living people)